Jacques Jorda, (born in Elne, on 1 April 1948) is a French former rugby league player and coach. Starting in rugby union for Stade Toulousain, he made his debut with the club in First Division in 1966 before joining Carcassonne in 1967 and then, USA Perpignan in 1969. In 1971 he switches codes opting for rugby league and for XIII Catalan from Perpignan where he won the French Championship and the Lord Derby Cup.He was concurrently the coach for Saint-Jacques, Soler and Palau before coaching XIII Catalan and France national team leading the latter to an historic success against Great Britain. He ended his career as director of the French Rugby League Federation.

Biography 
In his civil life, Jacques Jorda, after his studies at the hotel school of Toulouse, is committed with the town council of Perpignan, then, responsible of the Mutual Assurance Society of the local collectivities and restaurateur in Canet-en-Roussillon.

Honours

Player honours 

 Team : 
 Winner of the French Championship : 1979, 1982 and 1983 (XIII Catalan).
 Winner of the Lord Derby Cup : 2006, 1976, 1978 and 1980 (XIII Catalan).
 Finalist of the  French Championship : 1978 and 1981 (XIII Catalan).
 Finalist of the Lord Derby Cup : 1977 and 1983 (XIII Catalan).

Other honours 

 Knight of the Ordre national du Mérite (decree of 2 May 2002)

Notes and references

Notes

References

Bibliography

External links 

  Jacques Jorda at rugbyleagueproject.com

1948 births
Living people
France national rugby league team coaches
French rugby league coaches
French rugby league players
Knights of the Ordre national du Mérite
Palau Broncos coaches
Sportspeople from Pyrénées-Orientales
Stade Toulousain players
USA Perpignan players
XIII Catalan coaches
XIII Catalan players
US Carcassonne players